The Chef, is a 2009 Iranian TV series directed by Mohammad Reza Honarmand. It tells the story of a successful couple that manage a very high-quality restaurant in Tehran, Iran. Both Parviz Parastui and Fatemeh Motamed-Arya have previously acted in Honarmand's films and series such as The Changed Man, Azizam Man Kook Nistam, and Zire Tigh

Plot 
A happily married couple runs one of the most successful restaurants in Tehran. The husband is the head chef and the wife is the manager. But when she goes around tooting her own horn on a television show, without acknowledging her husband's efforts, he takes offence and leaves the restaurant to launch a new one. What starts out as a small argument, keeps rising until it threatens to tear their family apart.

Cast
Parviz Parastui as Akbar AliMagham
Fatemeh Motamed-Arya as Mino KheyrKhah
Farhad Aslani
Manouchehr Azari		
Afsaneh Chehreh Azad		
Mohammad Reza Ghaffari		
Roohollah Kamani	
Asha Mehrabi	
Feraidon Mehrabi
Hushang Harirchiyan	
Shabnam Moghaddami		
Mehraveh Sharifinia	 as Sara
Melika Sharifinia		
Ali Tabatabai		
Hoda Zeinolabedin		
Mehrdad Ziaei

Broadcast History
IRIB TV1 (2009-2010)
TV Alhijrah (in Malaysia, 2011-2012)
iFilm (2012–Present)

References

External links

Iranian television series
2000s Iranian television series
2009 Iranian television series debuts
2009 Iranian television series endings
Islamic Republic of Iran Broadcasting original programming